Jalaa Sporting Club, also known as Jeunesse Sportivo Alep (Shabibeh), is a Syrian basketball club based in the city of Aleppo. They compete in the Syrian Basketball League, and have qualified for the Asian Champions Cup on four occasions, with its best finish in 2006 and 2007, where they finished second on both occasions. 

Al Jalaa is the club with the largest number of titles in Syria and is the holder of the first Syrian basketball successes at the international level. Al-Jalaa has supplied the Syria men's national basketball team with many great players throughout its history.

History
Jeunesse Sportivo Alep (Shabibeh), later known as Jalaa SC, was established under the name of the Catholic Youth Club and its headquarters was in Al-Aziziyah district. They managed to win the Syrian Basketball League for 23 consecutive years from 1956 until 1978. They also won 9 Syrian Basketball championships in this period.

They participated in the FIBA European Champions Cup in 6 times: 1958 (second round), 1970–71 (first round), 1971–72 (withdrew), 1972–73 (withdrew), 1975–76 (first round), and 1978–79 (quarterfinals group stage). However, they failed to secure any single win in all their matches in the competition.

They won the first Arab Club Championship in 1978, when they beat Orthodox BC at home in Aleppo.

After 1979, there was a retreat from the positions, as the main rival of the Al-Ittihad SC club was the best basketball club in the country until the first half of the 1990s. The club therefore worked with juniors and youth.

In 2005, the team returned in excellent form by winning the Syrian Basketball Cup. In the following 2006 season, after defeating the cup triumph and participating in the SBL final, the team qualified for the FIBA Asia Champions Cup, where they reached the final in which they lost to Fastlink BC.

Al-Jalaa won the Syriatel Cup (Al-Jalaa International Championship) in 2005 after defeating the Lebanese Sagesse SC in the final and achieved runner-up in the Dubai International Championship 2007.

In the 2007 season, the club managed to win the domestic league and the cup and reach the final of the WABA league, where they lost to Saba Battery 79-82. In the same season, a team led by Sherif Azma reached the Asian Cup final, where they lost to Saba Battery 75:83.

In the 2008 and 2009 seasons, the club managed to win both domestic competitions (SBL and Cup), but with the exception of winning the Aleppo Cup, it did not succeed at the international level.

In the 2010 season, the CJS advanced to the 2010 WABA Cup as the Syrian league runner-up, and a 79:125 loss to Mahram BC prevented them from winning the competition. As finalists of the WABA Cup, they advanced to the 2010 Asian Cup, where they finished in 6th place after a quarter-final loss to Mahram BC.

In the 2011 season, they became SBL champions after the final victory over Al-Jaish and qualified for the WABA Cup. In the group stage of the tournament, they gradually defeated Al-Riyadi Beirut, Zob Ahan BC, Al Riyadi Amman and Al-Ahli Sanaa and advanced to the quarterfinals, in which they defeated ASU BC. The final of the WABA League in which they met Al-Riyadi Beirut lost in the decisive match 77:85.

As a finalist in the WABA league, the club participated in the 2011 FIBA Asia Champions Cup, in which after advancing from the group stage, it was eliminated in the quarterfinals with Smart Gilas and finished in 6th place.

In 2012, CJS defeated Al-Ittihad SC in the SBL final and won its last league title. After the outbreak of the Battle of Aleppo in 2012, the club's existence was threatened. However, the club managed to survive, and after the end of the war in Aleppo it continued its sports activities.

The CJS gained their first big success in a long time in the 2021 season, when they managed to beat the Al-Jaish SC in the Syrian Cup final.

Home arena
Al-Assad Sports Arena: 1978–present

The club also uses its Al Jalaa Arena for its home matches.

Club rivalry
Al-Jalaa SC plays the Aleppo city derby "El Clásico"  with its main rival Al-Ittihad SC.

Honours

Domestic
Syrian Basketball League
Winners (28), (22 as Shabibeh, 6 as Jalaa): 1956 - 1957 - 1958 - 1959 - 1960 - 1961 - 1962 - 1963 - 1964 - 1965 - 1966 - 1967 - 1968 - 1969 - 1970 - 1971 - 1972 - 1973 - 1974 - 1975 - 1976 - 1977 - 1978 - 2007 - 2008 - 2009 - 2011 - 2012 
Syrian Basketball Cup
Winners (14), (9 as Shabibeh, 5 as Jalaa):  2005 - 2006 - 2007 - 2009 - 2021

International
FIBA Asia Champions Cup
Runners-Up: 2006 - 2007
Sixth place: 2010 - 2011
WABA Champions Cup
Runners-Up: 2007 - 2010 - 2011 
Third place: 2006
Arab Club Basketball Championship
Winners (1): 1978
EuroLeague
Quarterfinals: 1978
 Aleppo International Tournament
Champions (1): 2008
 Syriatel Cup
Champions (1): 2005
Dubai International Tournament
Runners-Up: 2007
Third place: 2009
Fourth place: 2008 - 2010

International record

Sponsorship
As of 2022, the general sponsors of CJS are Katarji Group and Sinalco.

Current roster 
Squad for the 2021–2022 Syrian Basketball League season:

Transfers
Transfers for the 2021-22 season:

 Joining
  Mourad El Mabrouk from   ES Radès
  Haithem Saada from  Ezzahra Sports
  Wissam Yaqqub  from  Al-Ittihad SC

 Leaving
  Michael Madanly to  Al-Ittihad SC 
  Ishaq Oubid to  Al-Ittihad SC

Notable players

 Michel Madanly
 Rami Merjaneh

 Ronaldo Mouchawar

 Samaki Walker
 Damond Williams

Head coaches
 Gaby Arbadji (1957–1958)
 Sherif Azmi (2005–2007)
 Georgi Petrović (2007–2008)
 Mensur Bajramović (2008–2010)
 Robert Bachayani (2010–2012)
 Samer Ismail (2021–2022)
 Aboud Shakour (2022–present)

Season by season

All-time records

Most Syrian Basketball League champions (28 championships)
Most domestic titles (42 championships)

References

External links
 Asian Basketball Profile
 2011 Roster

 1978–79 FIBA European Champions Cup

Basketball teams in Syria
Basketball teams established in 1949
Sport in Aleppo
1949 establishments in Syria